The Wain may refer to

 The Great Wain or Charles's Wain, another name for the Big Dipper asterism
 The Lesser Wain, another name for the Little Dipper asterism